Scotland's Charity Air Ambulance (SCAA) is a registered charity which assists the Scottish Ambulance Service (SAS) with emergency medical services through the provision of helicopter-based air ambulances. 

SCAA air ambulances complement the state-funded aircraft that also operate across Scotland. 
A Eurocopter EC135 is based at Perth Airport. A second EC135 operates from Aberdeen Airport. Both are crewed by SAS paramedics and are tasked from the SAS ambulance control centre at Cardonald. , they have flown 1,300 missions.

History
The organisation registered as a charity in Scotland in October 2010. In late 2012, SCAA was hoping to raise money from public and private donations in excess of £1.5million every year. It commenced operations in May 2013, with a MBB Bo 105 airframe, registration G-NDAA, and flew 40 missions in the first month. After two months, the service changed the hours it operated, allowing deployment later in the day. This change was to make the ambulance available at times of high demand. By January 2014, the air ambulance had flown its 200th mission. In May 2014, after a year of operations they had completed nearly 300 missions. By February 2015, the ambulance had been despatched on almost 500 missions.

In March 2015, it was announced that the charity would receive £3.3M, allocated from Libor fines, which would allow the charity to replace their helicopter with a larger, more capable aircraft.

In October 2015, they upgraded to a Eurocopter EC135, which is faster and more powerful than the Bo 105. The new EC135, registered G-SCAA, previously operated for the NHS funded air ambulance in Scotland as G-SASB.

The charity reached 1,000 call-outs in March 2016.

Scotland's Charity Air Ambulance uses the radio call sign Helimed 76 for the Perth helicopter and Helimed 79 for the Aberdeen helicopter.

In April 2018, the charity announced that a drive was underway to raise £6M towards the running of a second helicopter for a three-year period. In November, they announced that this second aircraft would be based in Aberdeen and that they hoped that the service would be running by late 2019. A four-year contract was signed with Babcock Mission Critical Services Onshore in September 2019 for a Eurocopter EC135, callsign Helimed 79, to operate from Aberdeen International Airport from early 2020.

In the year ending March 2021, SCAA raised revenue of £6.0M, of which £3.3M was spent operating the air ambulance service.

Across 2021 SCAA deployed crews on 810 occasions and airlifted 333 people, with almost three quartes of these patients being flown to a major trauma centre.

Awards
Crew members were chosen as "Rural Heroes 2017" by the judges at the Scottish Rural Awards.

See also 
Air ambulances in the United Kingdom

References

External links

 
 

Air ambulance services in Scotland
Health charities in Scotland